Mentioned in Confidence is a 1917 silent film drama directed by Edgar Jones and produced by the Balboa Film Producing Company.

The film survives in the Library of Congress collection.

Cast
Vola Vale- Marjorie Manning
R. Henry Grey - Gordon Leigh
Frank Brownlee - Mr. Leigh
Melvin Mayo -Robert Manning
Leah Gibbs - Perda Brentane
Bruce Smith - Father Daly
Gordon Sackville - Capitalist

References

External links
Mentioned in Confidence @ IMDb.com

1917 films
American silent feature films
American black-and-white films
Silent American drama films
1917 drama films
1910s American films